Bactriola minuscula is a species of beetle in the family Cerambycidae. It was described by Fontes and Martins in 1977. It is known from Brazil.

References

Forsteriini
Beetles described in 1977